Microthyrium is a genus of fungi in the Microthyriaceae family.

Species
As accepted by Species Fungorum;

 Microthyrium aberrans 
 Microthyrium abnorme 
 Microthyrium acaciae 
 Microthyrium annuliforme 
 Microthyrium antivarense 
 Microthyrium applanatum 
 Microthyrium arizonense 
 Microthyrium baccarum 
 Microthyrium biciliatum 
 Microthyrium browneanum 
 Microthyrium buxicola 
 Microthyrium calophylli 
 Microthyrium cantareirense 
 Microthyrium carludovicae 
 Microthyrium cassiae 
 Microthyrium chinense 
 Microthyrium ciliatum 
 Microthyrium coffeae 
 Microthyrium cordiae 
 Microthyrium corynellum 
 Microthyrium crassum 
 Microthyrium cryptomeriae 
 Microthyrium cycadinum 
 Microthyrium cytisi 
 Microthyrium disjunctum 
 Microthyrium ekmanii 
 Microthyrium epimyces 
 Microthyrium eucalypti 
 Microthyrium eucalypticola 
 Microthyrium exarescens 
 Microthyrium fagi 
 Microthyrium fici-septicae 
 Microthyrium gramineum 
 Microthyrium grammatophylli 
 Microthyrium guadalupense 
 Microthyrium harrimanii 
 Microthyrium hederae 
 Microthyrium hippocrateae 
 Microthyrium holmiae 
 Microthyrium ilicinum 
 Microthyrium imperatae 
 Microthyrium inconspicuum 
 Microthyrium lauraceae 
 Microthyrium laurentii 
 Microthyrium lauri 
 Microthyrium leopoldvilleanum 
 Microthyrium litorale 
 Microthyrium macrosporum 
 Microthyrium maculicola 
 Microthyrium magellanicum 
 Microthyrium mahabaleshwarense 
 Microthyrium malenconianum 
 Microthyrium manihoticola 
 Microthyrium mbdense 
 Microthyrium melaleucae 
 Microthyrium microscopicum 
 Microthyrium mischocarpi 
 Microthyrium moravicum 
 Microthyrium munozi 
 Microthyrium nebulosum 
 Microthyrium nerii 
 Microthyrium nigropapillatum 
 Microthyrium nolinae 
 Microthyrium olivaceum 
 Microthyrium pamelae 
 Microthyrium paraguayense 
 Microthyrium phegopteridis 
 Microthyrium phoradendri 
 Microthyrium pieridis 
 Microthyrium pinophyllum 
 Microthyrium pithecellobii 
 Microthyrium propagulense 
 Microthyrium pyrenaicum 
 Microthyrium ranulisporum 
 Microthyrium rhombisporum 
 Microthyrium rimulosum 
 Microthyrium rubicola 
 Microthyrium salicis 
 Microthyrium scutiae 
 Microthyrium senegalense 
 Microthyrium sequoiae 
 Microthyrium setosum 
 Microthyrium styracis 
 Microthyrium subulati 
 Microthyrium thujae 
 Microthyrium tunicae 
 Microthyrium umbelliferarum 
 Microthyrium uvariae 
 Microthyrium versicolor 

Former species; (assume family Microthyriaceae, unless mentioned),

 M. alpestre  = Lichenopeltella alpestris 
 M. alsodeiae  = Dictyothyrium alsodeiae, Micropeltidaceae
 M. amygdalinum  = Phaeothyriolum amygdalinum 
 M. arcticum  = Ronnigeria arctica, Leptopeltidaceae
 M. asterinoides  = Prillieuxina asterinoides, Asterinaceae
 M. astomum  = Microthyriolum astomum, Parmulariaceae
 M. caaguazuense  = Asterinella caaguazensis 
 M. caaguazuense f. coperniciae  = Asterinella caaguazensis 
 M. cetrariae  = Lichenopeltella cetrariae 
 M. ciliatum var. hederae  = Microthyrium ciliatum 
 M. circinans  = Seynesia circinans, Cainiaceae
 M. confertum  = Calothyriopsis conferta 
 M. culmigenum  = Lichenopeltella alpestris 
 M. cytisi var. ulicis  = Microthyrium cytisi 
 M. cytisi var. ulicis-gallii  = Microthyrium cytisi 
 M. dryadis  = Stomiopeltis dryadis, Micropeltidaceae
 M. eucalypti sensu  = Phaeothyriolum microthyrioides 
 M. fuegianum  = Dictyothyrium fuegianum, Micropeltidaceae
 M. fuscellum  = Tothia fuscella 
 M. gomphisporum  = Vizella gomphispora, Vizellaceae
 M. gramineum var. major  = Microthyrium gramineum 
 M. grande  = Palawania grandis, Palawaniaceae
 M. ingae  = Aphanopeltis ingae, Asterinaceae
 M. iochromatis  = Cyclotheca iochromatis 
 M. juniperi  = Seynesiella juniperi 
 M. lagunculariae  = Schizothyrium lagunculariae, Schizothyriaceae
 M. litigiosum  = Leptopeltis litigiosa, Leptopeltidaceae
 M. longisporum  = Schizothyrium longisporum, Schizothyriaceae
 M. longisporum var. congoense  = Schizothyrium longisporum, Schizothyriaceae
 M. loranthi  = Cyclotheca loranthi 
 M. lunariae  = Leptothyrium lunariae, Pleosporales
 M. maculans  = Lichenopeltella maculans 
 M. malacoderma  = Schizothyrium malacodermum, Schizothyriaceae
 M. microscopicum f. macrosporum  = Microthyrium macrosporum 
 M. microscopicum subsp. arctoalpinum  = Microthyrium microscopicum 
 M. microscopicum var. dryadis  = Stomiopeltis dryadis, Micropeltidaceae
 M. microscopicum var. macrosporum  = Microthyrium macrosporum 
 M. microscopicum var. majus  = Microthyrium microscopicum 
 M. microscopicum var. minus  = Microthyrium microscopicum 
 M. nigroannulatum  = Lichenopeltella nigroannulata
 M. patagonicum  = Stomiopeltella patagonica, Micropeltidaceae
 M. pinastri  = Stomiopeltis pinastri, Micropeltidaceae
 M. psychotriae  = Calothyrium ryanae
 M. pulchellum  = Rhagadolobium pulchellum, Parmulariaceae
 M. pustulatum  = Calothyrium pustulatum
 M. reptans  = Trichothyrium reptans, Trichothyriaceae
 M. rhododendri  = Lembosina aulographoides, Lembosinaceae
 M. rickii  = Saccardinula rickii, Elsinoaceae
 M. smilacis  = Muyocopron smilacis, Muyocopronaceae
 M. sprucei  = Micropeltis sprucei, Micropeltidaceae
 M. virescens  = Asterella virescens, Astrosphaeriellaceae

References

External links
Index Fungorum

Microthyriales
Taxa named by John Baptiste Henri Joseph Desmazières